Yabby is a name given in Australia to two different kinds of crustacean:

 Cherax (freshwater yabby), a crayfish
 Trypaea (marine yabby), a ghost shrimp (infraorder Thalassinidea) which lives in the intertidal zone

See also
 Yabba (disambiguation)
 Yabby You (1946–2010), Jamaican reggae vocalist and producer

Animal common name disambiguation pages